Jon Mårdalen (August 18, 1895 – December 5, 1977) was a Norwegian cross-country skier who competed in the 1924 Winter Olympics.

In 1924 he finished fourth in the 50 km competition as well as fourth in the 18 km event.

Cross-country skiing results
All results are sourced from the International Ski Federation (FIS).

Olympic Games

References

External links
 Cross-country skiing 1924 

1895 births
1977 deaths
Norwegian male cross-country skiers
Olympic cross-country skiers of Norway
Cross-country skiers at the 1924 Winter Olympics